Bhurungamari is the northernmost upazila of Kurigram District in the Division of Rangpur, Bangladesh.

Geography

It has 33984 households and total area 236 km2.

Demographics
As of the 2011 Bangladesh census, Bhurungamari has a population of 231,538. Among them 113502 are male (49.02% of total population) and rest 50.98% are female. This Upazila's eighteen up population is 135078. Bhurungamari has an average literacy rate of 39.57% (7+ years), and the national average of 58.77% literate (78.46% in 2019).

Administration
Bhurungamari Upazila is divided into ten union parishads: Andharijhar, Bhurungamari, Boldia, Bangasonahat, Char Bhurungamari, Joymarirhat, Paiker Chhara, Pathardubi, Shilkhuri, and Tilai. The union parishads are subdivided into 70 mauzas and 126 villages.

Transport

Railway links
During the British era, there was a railway line linking Assam with Bengal that passed through Bhurngamari. The rail link was closed after the partition of India in 1947. Possibilities of resumption of traffic through the Bhurugamari-Sonahat section was discussed when the resumption of rail traffic between India and Pakistan took place in 1955.

Note: The map alongside presents the position as it stands today (2020). The international border was not there when the railways were first laid in the area in the 19th-20th century. It came up in 1947. Since then, it has been an effort to live up to the new realities. The map is 'interactive' (the larger version) - it means that all the places shown in the map are linked in the full screen map.

Developments
An inland port has been set up at Sonahat.

In 2018, the existing road bridge across the Dudhkumar River was found to be weak and a new bridge was sanctioned, along with a new highway. The Kurigram (Daserhat)-Nageshwari-Bhurungamari-Sonahat Land port road is to be converted to a national highway.

See also
Upazilas of Bangladesh
Districts of Bangladesh
Divisions of Bangladesh

References

External links

Upazilas of Kurigram District